Providence is a community in the Demerara-Mahaica Region of Guyana, on the east bank of the Demerara River, located at , altitude 1 metre (3 feet).

Providence is the home of the international cricket venue Providence Stadium. It also held few matches of 2007 ICC Cricket World Cup.

References

External links
 

Populated places in Demerara-Mahaica